Jacques Dewatre (5 June 1936 – 14 December 2021) was a French diplomat and politician. He served as Director-General for External Security from 1993 to 2000.

Biography
Dewatre studied at the École spéciale militaire de Saint-Cyr and became a parachutist. After fifteen years in the military, he joined the prefectural body in 1974. He became a sub-prefect in Aude, Haute-Savoie, and French Polynesia. He then served as prefect of French Guiana from 1986 to 1988, Saône-et-Loire from 1988 to 1991, and Réunion from 1991 to 1992. He served as Director-General for External Security from 1993 to 2000. From 15 March 2000 to 9 July 2001, he served as France's ambassador to Ethiopia.

He died following a long illness at Hôpital d'instruction des armées Percy in Clamart, on 14 December 2021, at the age of 85.

Distinctions
 Grand-Officer of the National Order of the Legion of Honour
 Grand-Officer of the National Order of Merit

References

1936 births
2021 deaths
Prefects of Réunion
Ambassadors of France to Ethiopia
People from Limoges
Grand Officiers of the Légion d'honneur
Grand Officers of the Ordre national du Mérite